Radyo Bandera 97.7 Sweet FM (DWFH 97.7 MHz) is an FM station owned by Fairwaves Broadcasting Network and operated under an airtime lease agreement by 5K Broadcasting Network, Inc. Its studios and transmitter are located at Dumaguete Diversion Rd. cor. W. Rovira Rd., Purok Malinawon, Brgy. Camanjac, Dumaguete.

References

External links
Sweet FM Dumaguete FB Page

Radio stations in Dumaguete
Radio stations established in 2019